Weissella fabalis  is a facultatively anaerobic and non-motile bacterium from the genus of Weissella which has been isolated from fermented cocoa beans from Brazil.

References

 

Bacteria described in 2013
Weissella